Sir Griffith Williams, 1st Baronet (died 1663) of Penrhyn, Carnarvonshire, was Sheriff of Carnarvonshire in 1650–1651, and held the unusual distinction of being granted a baronetcy by both the Lord Protector Oliver Cromwell and King Charles II.

Biography
Griffith Williams was the only son and heir of Robert Williams (died before February 1624), of Penryallt, near Conway, by Elizabeth (died 26 April 1608, buried at Conway), daughter of Griffith John Griffith, of Cefnamwich. was admitted to Lincoln's Inn on 21 February 1624.

Williams was Sheriff of Carnarvonshire in 1650–1651 and a Commissioner of Assessment there in 1656. He was created a Baronet by the Lord Protector Oliver Cromwell on 28 May 1658, a dignity, which was disallowed after the Restoration in May 1660, though about a year later he was (presumably on 
account of the loyal services of his late uncle. Archbishop John Williams), created a baronet, on 17 June 1661, by the King Charles II. He died towards the end of 1663. His son and heir Sir Robert Williams.

Family
Williams married, in or before 1627, Gwen (died in 1676), daughter of Hugh Bodwrda, of Bodwrda, Carnarvonshire. The will of his widow. They had nineteen children.

Notes

References
 

Year of birth missing
1663 deaths
People from Gwynedd
Baronets in the Baronetage of England
High Sheriffs of Caernarvonshire